Darlag County is a county of southeastern Qinghai province, China, bordering Sichuan to the south and west. It is under the administration of Golog Tibetan Autonomous Prefecture. The county seat is in the Town of Gyümai (Jimai).

Geography and Climate
Average low temperatures are below freezing from mid September to late May; however, due to the wide diurnal temperature variation, average highs are only below freezing from mid/late November thru early March. With monthly percent possible sunshine ranging from 47% in June to 70% in November, the county seat receives 2,467 hours of bright sunshine annually.

Administrative divisions
Darlag is divided into 1 town and 9 townships:

 Gyümai Town (吉迈)
 Manzhang Township (满掌乡)
 De'ang Township (德昂乡)
 Wosai Township (窝赛乡)
 Moba Township (莫坝乡)
 Shanghongke Township (上红科乡)
 Xiahongke Township (下红科乡)
 Jianshe Township (建设乡)
 Sangrima Township (桑日麻乡)
 Tehetu Township (特合土乡)

See also
 List of administrative divisions of Qinghai

References

External links
County Government's official website

County-level divisions of Qinghai
Golog Tibetan Autonomous Prefecture